This is an alphabetical list of films produced in Kenya.

0-9
40 Sticks (2020)
14 Million Dreams (2003)
18 Hours (2017)
6000 km di paura (1978)

B
The Baisikol (1997)
Balloon Safari (1975)
Boran Herdsmen (1974)
Boran Women (1974)

C
Chokora (2005)
The Constant Gardener (2005)
  Click Click Bang  (2022)

D
The Dance for Wives (2009)
Dangerous Affair (2002)
Disconnect (2018 film)

F
The First Grader (2010)
Flip Flotsam (2003)
Forest Chainsaw Massacre (2006)
From a Whisper (2008)
Fundi-Mentals (2014)

G
Gari Letu Manyanga (Our Hip Bus) (2007)
Grave Yard by Cezmiq Cast  (2014)
 The Great betrayal (2001)
 Game of Wits (2017)

H
Haba na Haba (2013)
The Hammer (by Cezmiq Cast 2015)
Hemingway, the Hunter of Death (2001)
House of Lungula (2013)

I
I Want to Be a Pilot (2006)
In the Shadow of Kilimanjaro (1986)
The Invisible Workers (2013)
Intellectual Scum (2015)
Ivy Indo Kenyan Movie(2020)

KKampf um den heiligen Baum, Der (1994)Kibera Kid (2006)Kobjes: A Rock for All Seasons (1980) (1986)

LThe Letter (2019)

MMalooned (2007)The Married Bachelor (1998)Men Against the Sun (1952)Mission to Rescue (2021)Mo & Me (2006)Mzima: Portrait of a Spring (1972)

NNairobi Half Life (2012)Nangos (2009)

OThe Oath Film (2005)Our Strength (2012)
’’Out of Africa’’ 1980s

PPath of a Nomad: An Explorer's Odyssey (2003)PeipaPrice of a Daughter, The (2003)Pumzi (2010)Poacher (2018)

RRafiki (2018)Rise and Fall of Idi Amin (1981)The Rugged Priest (2011)

S
Saïkati (1992) https://youtu.b/ZSvfY01OGL4Shuga (2009)Something Necessary (2013)
 The Stigma (2007)Stories of Our Lives (2014)

TThrough Hell (by Cezmiq Cast 2014)Togetherness Supreme (2010)To Walk with Lions (1999) (Canadian production filmed in Kenya)Toto Millionaire (2007)Toto's Journey (2006)

VVeve'' 2014

References

External links
 Kenyan film at the Internet Movie Database

Kenya